Rodolfo Antonio Camacho Duarte (October 17, 1975 – August 7, 2016) was a Colombian-born Venezuelan road racing cyclist. He and his son were shot and killed in his home on August 7, 2016.

Career

1999
1st in Stage 12 Vuelta al Táchira, San Cristóbal (VEN)
2000
1st in Stage 12 Vuelta a Venezuela, San Cristóbal (VEN)
2001
1st in General Classification Tour de la Guadeloupe (GUA)
1st in Stage 8 Vuelta al Táchira, La Grita (VEN)
2006
1st in Stage 7 part B Vuelta Internacional al Estado Trujillo, Carvajal (VEN)
2007
1st in Stage 8 Clasico Ciclistico Banfoandes, Cordero (VEN)
2008
1st in Stage 3 Clásico Virgen de la Consolación de Táriba, Lobatera (VEN)
1st in Stage 10 Clasico Ciclistico Banfoandes, San Cristóbal (VEN)
2009
6th in General Classification Vuelta a Venezuela (VEN)

References

 

1975 births
2016 deaths
Colombian male cyclists
Venezuelan male cyclists
Vuelta a Venezuela stage winners
Tour de Guadeloupe winners
Place of birth missing